School of Jazz and Contemporary Music is the second conservatory of The New School.  It is located on West 13th Street in New York City's Greenwich Village neighborhood. It was known as The New School for Jazz and Contemporary Music before it was rebranded as School of Jazz and Contemporary Music and becoming part of College of Performing Arts at The New School in 2015.

History

The School of Jazz and Contemporary Music was founded by David Levy, a former dean of Parsons School of Design, saxophonist Arnie Lawrence, and Paul Weinstein, the first chairperson of the program in 1986, as the Jazz & Contemporary Music Program.

 The school holds the philosophy that artists should be mentors, thus many teachers are working professionals.

Academics

The School of Jazz and Contemporary Music offers Bachelor of Fine Arts (BFA) degrees in jazz and contemporary music with concentrations in vocal and instrumental performance.

The core curriculum includes courses in performance, analysis, composition, music history, and liberal arts. In addition, students can select or audition for a wide range of elective courses and narrow their focus as they advance toward graduation.

Required courses

Core Curriculum
- Instrumental Instruction
- Jazz Improvisation Ensemble
- Ear Training I & II
- Theory/Harmony I & II
- Piano Proficiency I
- Rhythmic Analysis I
- Theory and Performance I
- Theory and Performance II
- Instrumental Sight-Reading
- Arranging Fundamentals
- Hand Percussion for Drummers (drummers only)

Vocal
- Basic Arranging for Vocalists
- Vocal Rhythm Section I (Fundamental)
- Vocal Rhythm Section II (Intermediate)
- Vocal Rhythm Section III (Advanced)
- Vocal Musicianship I & II
- Vocal Improvisation I & II
- Sight-Singing I
- Sight-Singing II
- Vocal Blues

Music History
- History of Jazz I & II
- Classical Music History
- 20th-Century Innovators—Debussy to Cage
- Contemporary Jazz and Its Exponents
- Introduction to World Music History

Music Business
- Internship in the Music Industry
- Marketing Yourself
- Music Pedagogy
- Music Industry Seminars
- Survey of the Music Business
- Stage Presence

Elective courses

Individual Composer and Bandleader Ensembles
- Ornette Coleman Ensemble
- Thelonious Monk Ensemble
- Art Blakey and the Jazz Messengers Ensemble
- Wayne Shorter Ensemble
- John Coltrane Ensemble
- Charles Mingus Ensemble
- Charlie Parker Ensemble
- Chick Corea Ensemble
- Electric Miles Ensemble
- Herbie Hancock Ensemble
- Sonny Rollins Ensemble
- Sun Ra Arkestra

Stylistic Ensembles
- Jazz Orchestra
- Live Drum ’n’ Bass Ensemble
- The Art of the Rhythm Section
- Blues Ensemble
- Futuristic Concepts of Music
- Gospel Choir
- Music of the Fringe
- Standards: The American Song Tradition
- Standards: The Art of the Ballad
- Super Trios Ensemble
- Advanced Rhythmic Concepts Ensemble
- M-BASE Ensemble
- Sound in Time
- Rhythm Section for Vocal Accompaniment
- Rhythm and Blues Revue Ensemble
- Vocal Jazz Ensemble

World music ensembles
- Afro-Cuban Jazz Orchestra
- Brazilian Jazz Ensemble
- Brazilian Percussion Workshop
- Choral Musicianship
- Cross Cultural Improvisation
- Middle East Ensemble

Composition
- Linear Composition for Improvisers
- Special Topics
- Introduction to Film Scoring
- Arranging/Orchestration I & II
- Advanced Composition/Arranging I & II
- Species Counterpoint
- Composers’ Forum

Technology
- Audio Engineering Internship
- Introduction to Finale
- MIDI Systems
- Basics of Web Design and Programming
- ProTools

Theory and analysis
- The Music of Bill Evans
- Advanced Ear Training
- Advanced Reharmonization I
- Advanced Reharmonization II
- Garzone's Triadic Chromatic Approach
- Bebop Harmony
- Score Reading and Analysis
- Vocal Master Class

Faculty

All faculty are working musicians in New York City.
 For a complete list of notable New School faculty, see List of The New School people.

Facilities

The School of Jazz and Contemporary Music is located on the fifth and sixth floors of 55 West 13th Street. The school's  state-of-the-art facility was designed to help young artists realize their goal of becoming successful music professionals. The facility offers administrative, classroom, practice, and rehearsal space, all constructed to the highest standards with attention to acoustics, soundproofing, and aesthetics. All classrooms are equipped with Yamaha grand pianos, drum kits, amplifiers, vocal PA systems, and full component stereo systems. Specialized instrumental practice and teaching rooms, listening library, and piano/MIDI labs are offered.

Performance and recording needs are served in an intimate and beautiful performance space seating 120, with full capacity for professional sound, lighting, and recording. A second studio is available for additional recording and engineering. Both studios are connected to the university's server and Internet sites, allowing for posted archival recordings and live streaming performance. Additional university performance facilities within a two-block radius of the Greenwich Village campus include a 170-seat performance auditorium and an excellent acoustically balanced concert hall with an audience capacity of 500.

Private lessons
Students' proficiency on their instruments is evaluated at the start of school.  Students who do not place out of proficiency requirements are assigned ten lessons with an instructor deemed appropriate to their needs. Students who place out of proficiency requirements are assigned nine lessons per semester with one or two instructors chosen in consultation with an advisor.

Alumni
 List of alumni of The New School for Jazz and Contemporary Music
For a complete list of notable New School alumni and faculty, see List of The New School people.

Beacons in Jazz awards
Beginning in 1986, the School of Jazz and Contemporary Music has annually recognized jazz musicians and others who have "significantly contributed to the evolution of American music culture" with the Beacons in Jazz award. Recipients have included: Ruth Brown, Hank Jones, Cab Calloway, Benny Carter, Aretha Franklin, Ahmet Ertegun, Dizzy Gillespie, Chico Hamilton, Percy Heath, Milt Hinton, Johnnie Johnson, Jackie McLean, James Moody, Max Roach, Wayne Shorter, Clark Terry, Joe Williams, George and Joyce Wein, Paul Weinstein and Phil Woods.

See also
 Education in New York City
 The New York Intellectuals
 The New York Foundation
 Project Pericles
 National Book Award

References

External links

Jazz LiveJournal Community

Jazz and Contemporary Music
Music schools in New York City
Jazz music education
New music organizations
Universities and colleges in Manhattan
Educational institutions established in 1986
1986 establishments in New York City
Jazz in New York City